The 10th Tennessee Infantry Regiment was an infantry regiment that served in the Union Army during the American Civil War.  It was originally recruited and designated as the 1st Middle Tennessee Infantry, largely from Irish-Americans.

Service
The 10th Tennessee Infantry was organized at Nashville, Tennessee, from May until August 1862, and mustered in for a three-year enlistment under the command of Colonel Alvan Cullem Gillem.

The regiment was attached to Post and District of Nashville, Tennessee, Department of the Cumberland, to June 1863. 3rd Brigade, 2nd Division, Reserve Corps, Department of the Cumberland, to September 1863. Defenses of Nashville & Northwestern Railroad to January 1864. 1st Brigade, Defenses of Nashville, Tennessee, January 1864. 1st Brigade, 3rd Division, XII Corps, Department of the Cumberland, to April 1864. 1st Brigade, 4th Division, XX Corps, Department of the Cumberland, to April 1865. 1st Brigade, 4th Division, District of East Tennessee, to June 1865.

The 10th Tennessee Infantry mustered out of service at Nashville, Tennessee April 2-May 17, 1865.

Detailed service
Post and garrison duty at Nashville, Tennessee, until September 1863. Ordered to Bridgeport, Alabama, September 24, 1863. Guard duty on Nashville & Northwestern Railroad, and garrison and guard duty at Nashville, Tennessee, until April 1865. Ordered to Greenville April 24, 1865, and duty in District of East Tennessee until June.

Commanders
 Colonel Alvan Cullem Gillem

See also

 List of Tennessee Union Civil War units
 Tennessee in the Civil War

References

 Dyer, Frederick H.  A Compendium of the War of the Rebellion (Des Moines, IA:  Dyer Pub. Co.), 1908.
Attribution
 

Military units and formations established in 1862
Military units and formations disestablished in 1865
Units and formations of the Union Army from Tennessee
1865 disestablishments in Tennessee
1862 establishments in Tennessee